Mokhlesur Rahman is a Bangladeshi politician and the former Member of the Bangladesh Parliament of Gazipur-3.

Career
Rahman was elected to parliament from Gazipur-3 as a Combined opposition candidate in 1988.

References

Living people
4th Jatiya Sangsad members
Year of birth missing (living people)